The Nukuma languages are a small family of three clearly related languages: 
Kwoma
Kwanga–Mende
Kwanga
Seim

They are generally classified among the Sepik languages of northern Papua New Guinea; Malcolm Ross places them in a Middle Sepik branch of that family.

They are spoken to the north of the Sepik River near Ambunti, and west of the Ambulas-speaking region of Mapr (near Wosera town).

Pronouns
Pronouns in Nukuma languages:
{| 
! pronoun !! Kwoma !! Mende
|-
! 1sg
| an || an ~ na ~ a
|-
! 2sg.m
| mɨ || mi
|-
! 2sg.f
| ni || ɲi
|-
! 3sg.m
| rɨ || or ~ ri
|-
! 3sg.f
| sɨ || os ~ si
|-
! 1du
| si || ʃi
|-
! 2du
| ki || ʃi
|-
! 3du
| pɨr || fri
|-
! 1pl
| no || ni
|-
! 2pl
| kwo || ci
|-
! 3pl
| ye || li
|}

Vocabulary comparison
The following basic vocabulary words are from Foley (2005) and Laycock (1968), as cited in the Trans-New Guinea database:

{| class="wikitable sortable"
! gloss !! Kwoma !! Mende
|-
! head
| masək || masiki
|-
! ear
| fuː; mabiya || mampla
|-
! eye
| miː; miyi || məsokome
|-
! nose
| sumojɨ; sumwonj || miñompo
|-
! tooth
| pu; tarəkwi || fu
|-
! tongue
| kwunja; tarekwoy || tarple
|-
! leg
| yaːte; yati || kumpa
|-
! louse
| nəkə; nɨka || nika
|-
! dog
| asa || asa
|-
! pig
| buri; poyi || 
|-
! bird
| apu || afi
|-
! egg
| apo; bey; mpei || fəla
|-
! blood
| pi || fi
|-
! bone
| apo; hapa || hapa
|-
! skin
| mampə || maume
|-
! breast
| muk; muku || muku
|-
! tree
| me || mi
|-
! man
| ma || ma
|-
! woman
| miːma || nogəpie
|-
! sun
| ya || ta
|-
! moon
| nowəka; nɨwɨka || niyaka
|-
! water
| uku || uku
|-
! fire
| hi; hiː || hi
|-
! stone
| papa || süŋkye
|-
! name
| hi || 
|-
! eat
| a || 
|-
! one
| pochi || 
|-
! two
| uprus || frišip
|}

See also
Kwoma people

References

 
Middle Sepik languages